Roman Senna De Angelis  (born 15 February 2001) is a Canadian racing driver, who currently competes in the IMSA SportsCar Championship for the Heart of Racing Team.

Career
De Angelis began his racing career in karting at the age of 9 and at the age 13 won his first title, the 2014 Canadian National Karting Championship. In 2016 De Angelis moved up from karting to F1600 where he won Rookie of Year honors for his second-place finish in the 18-race season.

De Angelis then moved on to race Porsche 911 GT3s competing in the IMSA GT3 Cup Challenge Canada with Mark Motors Racing beginning in 2017. In his first season he won the GT3 Cup Gold Class Canadian Championship, becoming the youngest driver to win the championship in GT3 Cup history at 16 years of age.

In 2018 De Angelis continued racing for Mark Motors Racing moving up to the GT3 Platinum Class and partnered with Kelly Moss and Racing for Children to compete in the IMSA Porsche GT3 Cup Challenge USA by Yokohama. De Angelis finished the year as runner up in both series. 2018 also saw De Angelis win his first endurance race of his career at the inaugural IMSA Prototype Challenge Roar Before the Rolex 24 driving the No. 4 Ligier JS P3 for ANSA Motorsports.

In 2019, racing with the same teams, De Angelis had the most successful season of his career winning both the GT3 Cup Platinum Class Canadian & GT3 Cup Platinum Class USA Championships, De Angelis was the first driver to accomplish this feat. De Angelis finished the 2019 season with 18 victories, 14 pole positions and 22 podiums in 24 race starts.

For the 2020 season  De Angelis joined the IMSA Weathertech Series in the GT Daytona Class competing for the Heart of Racing Team in the #23 Aston Martin GT Vantage car. The team got there first podium of the year at Charlotte Motor Speedway with a third-place finish and a season best second place finish at the Mobil 1 Twelve Hours of Sebring. De Angelis also raced in the Bathurst 12 Hour at Mount Panorama Motor Racing Circuit in New South Wales, Australia for the Garage59 Team in an Aston Martin GT3 with co-driver Andrew Watson. The pair finished the race thirteenth overall and second in their GT3 Silver class. De Angelis also partnered with Panoz Racing to compete in four races of the GT4 America Series season. De Angelis and teammate Parker Chase claimed victories at Circuit of The Americas and Indianapolis.

2021 saw De Angelis remain with Heart of Racing, being joined by Ross Gunn who replaced team boss Ian James as his principal partner. The team got  their first podium finish at the Mobil 1 Twelve Hours of Sebring and their first victory in Detroit at the Detroit Grand Prix at the Raceway at Belle Isle Park. De Angelis and Gunn claimed the WeatherTech Sprint Cup title as the highest scoring team in the sprint events through the season.

De Angelis was also a part of the Aston Martin Racing Driver Academy for the 2020 and 2021 seasons, as the only Canadian, in the 15-driver competition to find the next generation of GT endurance stars.

Racing record

Career summary

* Season still in progress.

Complete WeatherTech SportsCar Championship results
(key) (Races in bold indicate pole position)

* Season still in progress.

References

External links
 

2001 births
Living people
Canadian racing drivers
Porsche Supercup drivers
WeatherTech SportsCar Championship drivers
Aston Martin Racing drivers
W Racing Team drivers
24H Series drivers